The  is a large multi-purpose public cultural facility in Chūō-ku, Niigata, Japan, which opened on 22 October 1998.

Facilities
There are 1,890 main concert hall seats and 903 theater seats.

Access

Train / Car
The complex is located within Hakusan Park, and the nearest station to the facility is Hakusan Station on the JR Echigo Line, 20 minutes' walk away. It is 15 minutes by car from the main Niigata Station.

Teansit bus
There is a BRT "Bandai-bashi Line" bus stop 'Shiyakusyo-mae' (Stop No.08) near the facilitiy. Also, Niigata City Loop Bus has a stop 'Hakusan Koen mae'.

References

Surrounding area
 Hakusan Park
 Hakusan Shrine
 Niigata Prefectural Civic Center
 Niigata City Athletic Stadium

External links
 

Concert halls in Japan
Buildings and structures in Niigata (city)